This is a list of yearly Southland Conference football standings.  From 1996 to 2002, for football only, the Southland Conference was known as the Southland Football League.

Southland Conference standings

References

Southland Conference
Standings